Dr. Helmut Mylius was a German industrialist, leader of the Party of the Radical Middle Class (Radikale Mittelstandspartei), and since 1930 the editor of the Frankfurt-based right-wing political and economics weekly publication, Die Parole der radicalen Staats-und Wirtschaftreform. He was accused of conspiracy to assassinate Adolf Hitler during 1935.  He managed to avoid getting arrested due to the influence of his friend, General Erich von Manstein and made his way to the Army as a Quartermaster.

References

External links
 Voting slip showing Mylius as candidate for Radikale Mittelstandspartei

German industrialists
20th-century German businesspeople
Year of birth missing
Year of death missing